Uttarakhand Power Corporation Limited (UPCL) is the company responsible for electricity transmission and distribution within the Indian state of Uttarakhand. The incumbent chairman is Smt. Radha Raturi. As the sole distributor of power in Uttarakhand, it manages Uttarakhand's 2600 MW daily demand.

References

Electric power companies of India
Uttarakhand
Energy companies established in 2000
2000 establishments in Uttarakhand
Indian companies established in 2000